Fibenare Guitars (fIbena:re, FIY-BEH-NAH-REH) is a guitar manufacturing company established in 1998.

Instruments 

Basic Jazz

Erotic

Globe Bass

Roadmaster

Signature models

Unique

Players 

Little G. Weevil, Tom Quayle, Lance Keltner, Fish!, Richard Scheufler, Gene Black (Joe Cocker) etc.

References

External links
  Fibenare Guitars Co. Official Website
  Fibenare Guitars Co. on Facebook

Guitar manufacturing companies
Companies established in 1998
Musical instrument manufacturing companies of Hungary
Manufacturing companies based in Budapest
Hungarian brands
1998 establishments in Hungary